This is a list of districts of Sierra Leone by Human Development Index as of 2021.

References

Sierra Leone
Human Development Index
Districts